Rick Lamar Camp (June 10, 1953 – April 25, 2013), was an American professional baseball pitcher who played in Major League Baseball (MLB) for a total of nine seasons with the Atlanta Braves between 1976 and 1985.

Biography
Camp was born in Trion, Georgia, and was best known for hitting a game-tying 18th-inning home run on a game that began on July 4, 1985, and ended on July 5th, against the New York Mets with two outs and an 0-2 count off Tom Gorman; this was the only home run of his twelve-season pro career (including nine in the majors). Representing the tying run in the 19th inning, Camp struck out to end the game and was the losing pitcher. The Braves had run out of position players and had no choice but to let Camp bat in the 18th and 19th innings, even though his career batting average was .074. The game started on July 4 at 7:05 pm, but due to extra innings and three long rain delays, it did not end until 3:55 am on July 5, the second latest any major league game has ever ended. (After the last out, the night still wasn't over: the Braves gave their fans a promised fireworks show at four in the morning.)

In September 2005, Camp was sentenced, along with four other people, including former Georgia State Representative Robin L. Williams, to a term in federal prison for conspiring to steal more than $2 million from the Community Mental Health Center in Augusta, Georgia. Camp received a three-year sentence, while Williams got ten years. Camp died on April 25, 2013, at his home at the age of 59.

References

External links

1953 births
2013 deaths
Atlanta Braves players
Major League Baseball pitchers
Baseball players from Georgia (U.S. state)
American sportspeople convicted of crimes
Kingsport Braves players
Savannah Braves players
Richmond Braves players
West Georgia Wolves baseball players
People from Chattooga County, Georgia
People from Bartow County, Georgia
Sportspeople from the Atlanta metropolitan area